C. spinosa may refer to:
 Caesalpinia spinosa, the tara, a small leguminous tree species native to Peru
 Calceolispongia spinosa, an extinct crinoid species
 Calicotome spinosa, a very spiny, densely branched shrub species
 Canadia spinosa, an extinct annelid worm species
 Capparis spinosa, a perennial spiny shrub species
 Caragana spinosa, a flowering plant species in the genus Caragana
 Carica spinosa, synonym for a flowering plant species Jacaratia spinosa
 Catunaregum spinosa, a flowering plant species in the genus Catunaregum
 Celtis spinosa, a woodland plant species in the genus Celtis
 Chaetophora spinosa, a beetle species in the genus Chaetophora
 Chaetopleura spinosa, a mollusc species in the genus Chaetopleura
 Chira spinosa, a jumping spider species in the genus Chira
 Chloracantha spinosa, a flowering plant species
 Cleocnemis spinosa, a running crab spider species in the genus Cleocnemis
 Cleome spinosa, a flowering plant species in the genus Cleome
 Cochranella spinosa, a frog species
 Colletia spinosa, a flowering plant species in the genus Colletia
 Conothele spinosa, a medium-sized spider species in the genus Conothele
 Copa spinosa, a sac spider species in the genus Copa

See also
 Spinosa (disambiguation)